Muhsin Yaşar (born December 31, 1995) is a Turkish professional basketball player who plays as Center for Gaziantep Basketbol of the Basketbol Süper Ligi (BSL). He averaged 9.4 points per game in 2019-20. On June 5, 2020, Tofas extended his contract for two seasons.

References

External links
Muhsin Yaşar EuroCup Profile
Muhsin Yaşar TBLStat.net Profile
Muhsin Yaşar Eurobasket Profile
Muhsin Yaşar TBL Profile

Living people
1995 births
Centers (basketball)
Gaziantep Basketbol players
Tofaş S.K. players
Turkish men's basketball players
Sportspeople from Yalova